Nakkila is a municipality of Finland. The Kokemäki River flows along the center of Nakkila. The municipality is unilingually Finnish. The name Nackeby was earlier used in Swedish.

There are two major sights, the Nakkila Church and the film studio Villilä, often referred as "Hollywood of Finland". Nakkila is also well known for the European river lampreys, which are a traditional food of the locality.

History 
In the early days of the Continuation War, Järvikylä, Nakkila was a target of a strange bombing, when the Soviet bombers carried out the only air bombing of the Satakunta region. The reason of the bombing is still unknown.

Demographics

Economy 

Nakkila's most significant industrial companies are Nakkila Works konepaja and Länsi-Suomen Voima Oy's hydropower plant. Smaller industrial activities have been represented by the carpentry industry. The Suominen Corporation's nonwovens factory (formerly Suomisen nahkatehdas) has also been a major employer, but much of the production has been shut down by the end of 2012.

Villages in Nakkila 
The year following the name of the village indicates when the first document entry is known about the village.

Arantila, Anola (1410), Hormisto, Järvikylä, Kivialho, Kukonharja (1354), Lammainen (1348), Leistilä (1441), Masia, Matomäki, Pakkala, Punapakka, Penttala, Pysykykangas, Ruskila, Soinila, Tattara (1441), Tervasmäki, Uotinmäki, Viikkala, Villilä(1451), Vuohimäki, Hohtari.

Transport 
Nakkila's most significant road is valtatie 2 between Helsinki and Pori. The Tampere-Pori railway also passes through Nakkila. Nakkila is served by OnniBus.com route Helsinki—Pori.

Politics
Results of the 2011 Finnish parliamentary election in Nakkila:

Left Alliance  22.1%
True Finns  19.1%
Centre Party  18.5%
Social Democratic Party  17.7%
National Coalition Party  15.9%
Green League  3.2%
Christian Democrats  3.2%
Other parties  0.3%

Attractions 

Nakkila's attractions include Finland's first functionalist church, completed in 1937, and Villilä film studio, which is sometimes nicknamed "Hollywood of Finland". Villilä has shot parts of the films Sibelius (2003), Kaksipäisen kotkan varjossa (2005), FC Venus (2005) and Risto Räppääjä ja liukas Lennart (2014). There are also many archeological monuments in Nakkila, the most important of which are the Kiukainen cultural area in Uotinmäki, the Selkäkangas burial mounds in Viikkala from the bronze ages and the Rieskaronmäki bronze age residence in Kivialho.

Other attractions include: 
Kotiseutumuseo
Juustomeijerimuseo
Pyssykankaan koulumuseo.

Sports 
The Nakkila sporting center is the home of all sport activity in Nakkila (excluding the school ice hockey rinks and gyms) notable sports clubs from Nakkila include NTK Nakkila, Nakkilan Nasta, Paterit and Nakkilan Vire. NTK is a floorball club, Nasta has a football and a futsal section. Paterit plays volleyball and Vire is an athletics team.

The Finnish Championships of cross country running of 2022 are being held in Nakkila from 7th of May 2022 to 8th of May 2022.

Notable people
Edvard Hannula (1859–1931), Finnish clergyman and politician
Kyllikki Pohjala (1894–1979), Finnish politician
Simo Frangén (1963) comedian
Juho Wiktor Suominen (1877–1935) manufacturer
Jesse Laaksonen (1989) ice hockey player
Niklas Nevalainen (1993) ice hockey player
Eemeli Reponen (1990) footballer
Axel Kurck (1555–1630) warlord
Tauno Matomäki (1937) Vuorineuvos
Markus Palttala (1977) racing driver

Sister cities

Nakkila is twinned with:
 Boksitogorsk, Leningrad Oblast, Russia
 Hudiksvall, Sweden

References

External links

Municipality of Nakkila – Official website 

Populated places established in 1861
1861 establishments in Finland
Nakkila